The Royal New Zealand College Of General Practitioners (the College) is a professional body and postgraduate educational institute that sets standards for general practice in New Zealand, providing research, assessment, ongoing education, advocacy and support for general practitioners and general practice.

Established in 1974, the College’s motto is Cum Scientia Caritas which translates as ‘with knowledge, compassion’. This captures its core aim to improve equitable access to quality health care for all New Zealanders.

The College is there throughout a general practitioner’s career from initial interest, to Fellowship, teaching and even owning a practice. The introduction of the Division of Rural Hospital Medicine (DRHM), Kapa Kaiaka and the evolution of Aiming for Excellence in recent years are examples of how the College has listened and acted on the changing landscape of health care.

The college has approximately 5,100 members, representing around 90 percent of all general practitioners in New Zealand.

Training programmes 
The College administers two training programmes: the General Practice Education Programme and the Rural Hospital Training Programme.

The General Practice Education Programme (GPEP) is the pathway to a specialist career as a general practitioner.

The Rural Hospital Training Programme teaches core components and specific skills to tackle the wide range of hospital situations in a rural context.

Organisation
The College is built from six components: the Board, National Advisory Council, Senior Management Team, Educational Advisory Group, chapters and faculty boards.

The Board 
A culturally diverse Board governs the College; elected Board members are general practitioners, supported by independent directors. The seven Board members include:

 An elected President
 Three elected College Fellows
 A representative from Te Akoranga a Māui, the College's Maori chapter
 Up to two members appointed by the Board, who need not be members of the College

National Advisory Council 
The Council is the listening post for all College members and relays critical viewpoints from their local Faculty or Chapter regarding policy issues, priorities for policy work and other opinions from around New Zealand to the Board. The Council is composed of one member from every Faculty and Chapter all over New Zealand.

Senior Management Team 
The senior management team leads College staff to achieve our strategic aims of:

 Growing the GP workforce
 Setting quality standards for practices
 Representing our members
 Contributing to equitable health care for all New Zealanders.

Education Advisory Group 
The EAG provides our Board, chief executive and management team with expert advice for our education and training programmes, including GPEP for registrars, Fellowship Assessment standards, and continuing professional development for Fellows.

Other representative groups

Faculties and Sub-faculties
College faculties are based on geographical areas, and include: Northland, Auckland, Waikato/Bay of Plenty, Gisborne, Hawkes Bay, Manawatu, Taranaki, Wellington, Nelson-Marlborough, Canterbury, Otago, and Southland.

Faculty representation sallow members to be involved in discussion and decision-making at a regional level. All college members are automatically assigned to a regional faculty and will receive information about faculty activities directly.

Te Akoranga a Māui
The College's Māori representative group Te Akoranga a Māui is involved in every part of its work, from strategic level to operational level. Membership of Te Akoranga a Māui are open to members who identify as Māori.

The name of Te Akoranga a Māui holds special significance for its members and for the College. Māui refers to Sir Māui Pōmare, the first Māori doctor to graduate from any medical school, and Akoranga means teaching, learning and education.

With more than 150 members, Te Akoranga a Māui is proud to be the first indigenous representative group established in any Australian or New Zealand medical college.

Chapters
The college currently has four chapters based on major national areas of practice:

The Pacific Chapter 
Made up of members who identify as Pasifika, it also welcomes members who serve communities with large Pacific populations or have interest in Pacific health issues.

Registrars' Chapter 
The voice of registrars; GPEP1 seminar groups elect a representative. During GPEP2/3 a representative is elected from each learning group and one from Rural Hospital Medicine. The resulting committee works together to provide activities that support and represent registrars.

Rural General Practitioners’ Chapter 
What issues are facing rural practitioners? How can we put a ‘rural lens’ over the work of the College? What initiatives could improve the quality of rural training and general practice? Rural GPs have the opportunity to connect and collaborate to address these questions through the Chapter’s committees.

The Division of Rural Hospital Medicine 
This Chapter serves as a hub to define and improve the body of knowledge for this specialist field, while providing education and collegial support. All Division of Rural Hospital Medicine New Zealand members automatically belong to this Chapter.

Membership
Categories of membership of the college are split into four main groups:

 Fellow 
 Member 
 Associate in Training 
 Associate in Practice

Publications
Available on the College website, publications produced by this organisation include:

 The Journal of Primary Health Care (JPHC).
 GP Pulse, a current affairs magazine.
 ePulse, a e-newsletter carrying salient news items, information about consultations, events, and vacancies.
Workforce Survey Reports, identifying areas of general practice that need attention, as well as shaping the primary care sector's strategic direction.

References

External links
Royal New Zealand College of General Practitioners Official website

Medical associations based in New Zealand
Organisations based in New Zealand with royal patronage